Hammerbacher is a German surname. Notable people with the surname include:

Anton Hammerbacher (1871–1956), German politician
Hans Wilhelm Hammerbacher (1903–1980), German writer
Herta Hammerbacher (1900–1985), German landscape architect
Jeff Hammerbacher, American data scientist

German-language surnames